Dmitry Beliakov is a Russian photojournalist, born in 1970, in the Vologda region, in Northwestern Russia.

Career 
From 1999 to 2007, he documented the Chechen War. Throughout this period, he tried to remain neutral through his images, neither favouring the Russian government nor the Chechen rebels. As a war photojournalist he faced ample danger with land mines and mortar fire. He was also confronted by censors and restrictions during his coverage of the conflict.

Beliakov has received many respected awards in photojournalism. His work has been published in many notable newspapers and magazines, including The Sunday Times Magazine, Paris Match, GEO magazine, The New York Times, The Philadelphia Inquirer and the British Telegraph Magazine. He was profiled in a CBS News and Showtime Independent Films documentary drama called Three Days in September in 2006.

Beliakov's work has been exhibited in Italy and Russia. In 2011 his document of portraits of Russian Special Forces was exhibited at the State Central Museum of Contemporary History of Russia.

In August 2014, while covering the War in Donbass in eastern Ukraine, Dmitry Beliakov and his colleague Mark Franchetti, a reporter for the British newspaper The Sunday Times, pleaded with the pro-Russian rebel leader Alexander Khodakovsky to release Iryna Dovhan, a local resident who had been abducted by the insurgent group Vostok Battalion and subjected to imprisonment, torture and humiliation, for being accused of being a spy for the Ukrainian forces. This plead came after a photograph of her mistreatment taken by another photojournalist, Maurício Lima, stirred widespread outrage in Ukraine, prompted a social media effort to identify her and drew the attention of United Nations human rights monitors. The plead was attended and she was released.

References

Russian photojournalists
People of the Chechen wars
Pro-Russian people of the war in Donbas
People from Vologda Oblast
Living people
1970 births